Percy Sheardown (1911–1993) was a Canadian bridge player.

Bridge accomplishments

Wins

 North American Bridge Championships (4)
 Reisinger (2) 1936, 1951 
 Spingold (2) 1964, 1965

Runners-up

 North American Bridge Championships (1)
 von Zedtwitz Life Master Pairs (1) 1964

Notes

External links

Canadian contract bridge players
1911 births
1993 deaths